The 2022 Huddersfield Giants season was the Huddersfield Giants rugby league football club's 2022 season, in which they competed in Super League XXVII and the 2022 Challenge Cup. They were coached by Ian Watson.

Super League

League table

Challenge Cup

2022 Squad

References

External links
 

Huddersfield Giants seasons
Super League XXVII by club